Charles Fabian Figueiredo Santos (born 12 April 1968) is a Brazilian football manager and former player, who played as a striker.

Playing career
Charles Fabian was chosen for the 1989 Copa América while playing for Esporte Clube Bahia in his home state of Bahia. He was cut from the final squad days before Brazil's opening game against Venezuela, in his club's city of Salvador. The game was played in a half-full stadium, the flag of Brazil was burned and the national anthem jeered at, while flares were thrown at the Brazilian bench. Charles Fabian appreciated the support given to him, but rejected the burning of the flag.

Charles Fabian was the top scorer of the 1990 Campeonato Brasileiro Série A, with 11 goals. He was the second player from a Northeast Brazilian club to do so after Ramón for Santa Cruz Esporte Clube in 1973, and the feat has only been repeated since by Diego Souza for Sport Club do Recife in 2016.

Managerial career
Charles Fabian had two spells as interim manager of Bahia in 2006, and another in 2014, as the club changed manager a Brazilian record 63 times between 2003 and 2018. On 7 October 2015, he was hired on a permanent basis in place of Sérgio Soares for the conclusion of the 2015 Campeonato Brasileiro Série B. Having missed out on promotion, he was replaced by Doriva.

On 3 February 2017, Charles Fabian left Anápolis Futebol Clube by mutual consent after presiding over a draw and a loss in the first two games of the 2017 Campeonato Goiano.

Honours

Player

Club
Bahia
Brazilian League: 1
 1988

Individual
Brazilian League Top Scorer: 1990
Rio de Janeiro State League Top Scorer: 1994

References

External links

Charles at BDFutbol

1968 births
Living people
Sportspeople from Bahia
Brazilian footballers
Brazilian football managers
Brazil international footballers
Brazilian expatriate footballers
1989 Copa América players
Copa América-winning players
Expatriate footballers in Argentina
Expatriate footballers in Spain
Campeonato Brasileiro Série A players
La Liga players
Argentine Primera División players
Campeonato Brasileiro Série A managers
Campeonato Brasileiro Série B managers
Esporte Clube Bahia players
Málaga CF players
Cruzeiro Esporte Clube players
Boca Juniors footballers
Grêmio Foot-Ball Porto Alegrense players
CR Flamengo footballers
Sociedade Esportiva Matonense players
Desportiva Ferroviária players
Camaçari Futebol Clube players
Esporte Clube Bahia managers
Camaçari Futebol Clube managers
Associação Desportiva Recreativa e Cultural Icasa managers
Association football midfielders